Juho Eljas Erkko (1 June 1895 in Helsinki – 20 February 1965 in Helsinki) was a Finnish politician and journalist. He was a foreign minister and negotiated with the Soviet Union before the Winter War started. Erkko's father was politician and journalist Eero Erkko and son journalist Aatos Erkko.

Eljas Erkko graduated as Abitur in 1914, Vimpeli School of War in 1918 and Master of Laws in 1922. In 1918, he fought for the White Guards in the Finnish Civil War Battle of Ruovesi. He was elected as a Member of Parliament on 1 September 1933 from Uusimaa constituency. Erkko was a President's elector chosen by voters in the presidential election 1931, 1937, 1940 and 1943.

Erkko was the Minister of Foreign Affairs between 1938 and 1939, as the Finns negotiated with the Soviet Union. The Soviets demanded exchange of areas with Finland. Erkko did not want to make any concessions. As the Winter War started, Väinö Tanner assigned a new government and decided to appoint himself as foreign minister. Between 1939 and 1940 he was a chargé d'affaires in Stockholm.

At the beginning of the Continuation War, Erkko was a head of POW office in Finland till 1942. After the war, Erkko was charged in court-martial in 1946, the charges were dropped.

Later years Erkko worked as CEO and Chairman of the Board of Directors of Sanoma.  He was also the Chairman of the Board of Directors in many Finnish companies, such as Rautakirja and Suomen Tietotoimisto, and a head of supervisory board in Kansallis-Osake-Pankki. Erkko was also a head of government in the Finnish American Association.

References

External links

1895 births
1965 deaths
Politicians from Helsinki
People from Uusimaa Province (Grand Duchy of Finland)
National Progressive Party (Finland) politicians
Ministers for Foreign Affairs of Finland
Members of the Parliament of Finland (1933–36)
People of the Finnish Civil War (White side)
Winter War
Finnish publishers (people)
20th-century Finnish journalists
World War II political leaders